Corrimony Falls is a waterfall on the River Enrick, near Corrimony in Glenurquhart, in the Highland council area of Scotland. It is a local tourist attraction in the spring and summer.

See also
Waterfalls of Scotland

References

Waterfalls of Highland (council area)